Chamberlain Oyibocha Orovwuje (July 31, 1935 – June 2012), Ogurimerime I, was the Ovie of Agbon Kingdom from 1958 till 2012. He was also the former chairman of Delta State Council of Traditional Rulers. He ruled the traditional kingdom of Agbon for 54 years and clinched the title of the longest reigning monarch in Delta State.

Early life 
Chamberlain Oyibocha Orovwuje is a scion of the Orovwuje dynasty of Okpara Inland.  His Royal moniker was Ogurime- Rime, Okpara 1. He was the first King (Ovie) of Agbon Kingdom (The Agbon Kingdom is made up of sub clans of Okpara, Kokori, Eku, Orhuakpor, Ovu, and Igun) in Ethiope East Local Government of Delta State. He joined his ancestors in June 2012, aged 77 years. He ascended the throne in 1958 from the famous Saint Thomas College, Ibusa at the age of 23 years as the King of Agbon. As a young king in the 1950s, he was under the tutelage of M. G. Ejaife, the first Urhobo university graduate, Chief Otite Ijedia, Chief E.B. Eshalomi and Chief T.E.A. Salubi. He acquired the wisdom of leadership from these great men.

Leadership 
His leadership traits were seen beyond the traditional- political institution through his appointment to Government establishments as a board member of the Nigerian Coal Corporation, Enugu, Eastern Nigeria and the Chairman of the Bendel Hospitals Management Board by Brigadier Samuel Osaigbovo Ogbemudia. He also served as a non-Executive Director for many years with the defunct Bendel Glass Company Limited in Ughelli, Nigeria.

It is instructive to note that the late Ovie was exposed early in life to political and parliamentary governance with his appointment as a member of the Western Regional House of Chiefs and by extension with the creation of the Mid – West region, he served as a pioneer member of the Mid- Western House of Chiefs. What is more, at the larger community level, he was the Chairman Ukoko r Ivie r urhobo (Committee of Urhobo Kings) and a member of the Traditional Rulers of Oil Mineral Producing Communities of Nigeria (TROMPCON) and also Chairman Delta State Traditional Rulers Council.

His contribution to the western Urhobo council, through his constant dialogue with residents, is also noteworthy, particularly in the area of rural electrification. It is on good account that the Ovie influence on the Bendel Rural Electrification to his kingdom was positive and he was also instrumental to the citing of the local government at Isiokolo.

References

Lists of monarchs
Lists of African monarchs
1935 births
2012 deaths